Harpalus quadratus is a species of ground beetle in the subfamily Harpalinae. It was described by Maximilien Chaudoir in 1846. Its range is reported to cover Asia Minor and the Caucasus, and it lives in mountainous regions (elevation of 1500 to 2500 meters).

References

quadratus
Beetles described in 1846